In medicine, residual volume may refer to:

 Residual volume, air remaining in the lungs after a maximal exhalation; see lung volumes
 Residual volume, urine remaining in the bladder after voiding; see urinary retention